Christ Crowned with Thorns or Christ Mocked is a 1598-1600 oil on canvas painting by Annibale Carracci, now at the Pinacoteca Nazionale di Bologna.

History 

It is usually identified with a work mentioned by Giulio Mancini in his  Considerazioni sulla pittura (1620), in which he refers to the artist painting a "Christ whipped and pulled by the hair for the chapels of the "manigoldi" in the manner of fra Bastiano [i.e. Sebastiano del Piombo]" as an angry riposte to comments from his patron Odoardo Farnese on the superiority of past painters over present ones. Odoardo then saw the work hanging on a wall of the Palazzo Farnese, mistook it for a work by Luciani and stated that it confirmed his previous assertion, to which Annibale immediately replied that the work's artist was by "the grace of God, [still] alive".

Like the rest of the Farnese collection, the work moved from Rome to Parma and finally to Naples. At the end of the 18th century it passed to an English collector before going back on the market and being acquired by the Italian state for its present owner in 1951.

Dating
This remains controversial.

Gallery

References

External links 

Paintings in the collection of the Pinacoteca Nazionale di Bologna
Paintings depicting the Passion of Jesus
Paintings by Annibale Carracci
1600 paintings